The 2016–17 Adelaide United FC season was the club's 13th season since its establishment in 2003. The club participated in the A-League for the 12th time, the FFA Cup for the 3rd time, as well as the AFC Champions League for the 6th time.

Players

Squad information

Transfers

Transfers in

Transfers out

From youth squad

Contract extensions

Technical staff

Kits and Sponsors

Statistics

Squad statistics

|-
|colspan="24"|Players no longer at the club:

Pre-season and friendlies

Competitions

Overall

Overview

{| class="wikitable" style="text-align: center"
|-
!rowspan=2|Competition
!colspan=8|Record
|-
!
!
!
!
!
!
!
!
|-
| A-League

|-
| FFA Cup

|-
| AFC Champions League

|-
! Total

A-League

League table

Results summary

Results by round

Matches

FFA Cup

AFC Champions League

Group stage

References

External links
 Official Website

Adelaide United
Adelaide United FC seasons